Werauhia viridiflora is a plant species in the genus Werauhia. This species is native to Costa Rica, Venezuela and Ecuador.

References

viridiflora
Flora of Costa Rica
Flora of Venezuela
Flora of Ecuador